The 2011 season was Gwangju FC's first ever season in the K-League in South Korea. Gwangju FC will be competing in K-League, League Cup and Korean FA Cup.

Current squad

Match results

K-League

League table

Results summary

Results by round

Korean FA Cup

League Cup

Squad statistics

Appearances and goals
Statistics accurate as of match played 30 October 2011

Top scorers

Top assistors

Discipline

Transfer

In

Out

References

 Gwangju FC Official Website 

Gwangju FC
Gwangju FC seasons